Capital punishment in Bosnia and Herzegovina is prohibited. However, it was only on  that the capital punishment was completely erased from the Constitution of Republic of Srpska, one of Bosnia and Herzegovina's two entities. While it was still in place, it was endorsed under the Article 11 of the Constitution of the Republic of Srpska.

Bosnia and Herzegovina is party to abolitionist international instruments, including the Council of Europe Protocol no.6 and
Protocol no.13.

Executions since 1959
Source: SPSK Database

References

 https://web.archive.org/web/20050324105012/http://www.geocities.com/richard.clark32%40btinternet.com/europe.html

Law of Bosnia and Herzegovina
Bosnia
Death in Bosnia and Herzegovina
Human rights abuses in Bosnia and Herzegovina
1998 disestablishments in Bosnia and Herzegovina
1975 disestablishments in Bosnia and Herzegovina